Squalius microlepis is a species of freshwater fish in the family Cyprinidae.  It is found in Bosnia and Herzegovina and Croatia.

References

Squalius
Fish described in 1843
Taxonomy articles created by Polbot